What a Cinch is a 1915 film featuring Oliver Hardy.

Cast
 Oliver Hardy as Chief Myers (as Babe Hardy)
 Raymond McKee as Lt. Dick Young
 Frances Ne Moyer as Molly Mason
 Billy Bowers as Cohen, the Pawnbroker

See also
 List of American films of 1915
 Filmography of Oliver Hardy

External links

1915 films
American silent short films
1915 short films
American black-and-white films
1915 comedy films
Silent American comedy films
American comedy short films
1910s American films